Les Illuminés is a collection of narratives or essays by the French poet and author Gérard de Nerval. Subtitled Recits et Portraits, it was published in 1852.

The book consists of six narratives relating the adventures and mishaps of historical figures whose lives reflected different aspects of Nerval’s own experiences. It is a male counterpart to his Les Filles du feu.  The concerns of socialism in the eighteenth century and the French Revolution underline most of the narratives. The book is also subtitled: Les precurseurs du socialisme.

Contents 
  La Bibliothèque de Mon Oncle, a short introduction
  Le Roi de Bicêtre
  Histoire de l’Abbé de Bucquoy
  Les Confidences de Nicolas
  Jacques Cazotte, a French writer, author of The Devil in Love, unjustly guillotined during the French revolution at the age of 72. He inspired E. T. A. Hoffmann and Charles Nodier.
  Cagliostro
  Quintus Aucler

References

1852 books
Essay collections
1852 essays
French non-fiction books
Works by Gérard de Nerval